Eupithecia albertiata is a moth in the family Geometridae. It is found in Tajikistan.

The wingspan is about 18 mm. The ground colour of the forewings is greyish white and the hindwings are whitish with dark grey suffusion.

References

Moths described in 1961
albertiata
Moths of Asia